Meadowhead School is a mixed secondary school and Language College with academy status in Sheffield, South Yorkshire, England. There are currently around 1,841 students on roll, about 120 teaching staff and approximately 50 non-teaching staff. The school is also a language college.

History 
Meadowhead School was created when the two schools of Jordanthorpe Comprehensive School and Rowlinson School merged in 1987. The school remained on two sites approximately 0.25 miles apart until January 2007 when the new building was opened on land in between the two sites of Jordanthorpe. Rowlinson became Norton College. The previous school sites of Jordanthorpe were demolished. The site where the North Building once stood became a Gilders Volkswagen and Audi car showroom and the area where the South Building was became the new school's playing fields. The new building was built just to the south of where the original North Building stood.

School Specialism 
It has been a Specialist Language College since 2001 and was re-designated as such in 2005. The school converted to academy status in 2012.

Academic 
As of January 2023, the most recent data shows that the GCSE (Grade 5 or Above) pass rate, including English and Maths, was 57%, which was well above the average for Sheffield (47%) and for the UK (50%). 31% of students at Meadowhead School entered the English Baccalaureate, compared with 37% in Sheffield and 39% nationally.

In its most recent Ofsted inspection, the school was rated as ‘Good’.

Post-16 
Meadowhead gained Trust status in September 2009, and now offers post-16 courses.

In October 2017 Meadowhead School Academy Trust opened their new 6th form building. The building has been in the plan to be built for many years and the opening has led to much interest in their 6th Form facilities.

School Logo 
The School's logo is a phoenix, representing Meadowhead School rising from the ashes of Jordanthorpe Comprehensive School and Rowlinson School. There is a large statue of a phoenix in the central area of the school, named The Rosling.

Alumni

Meadowhead School
Elizabeth Henstridge, actress and model
Jordan Robertson, former footballer who played for Sheffield United and Southampton
Joe Rowley, footballer for AFC Flyde
Harvey Gilmour, footballer for FC Halifax Town

Jordanthorpe School
Helen Sharman OBE, chemist and astronaut
 Fraser Digby, footballer formerly of Manchester United and Swindon Town
 Joanne Catherall, singer and member of the band The Human League
 Susan Sulley, singer and also a member of the band The Human League

Rowlinson School
 Colin Crorkin MBE, Ambassador to the Gambia since 2014
 Candida Doyle, keyboard player in Pulp

Rowlinson Technical School
 Chris Watson (musician) of Cabaret Voltaire
 Chris Stainton, musician who has worked with Joe Cocker, The Who and Eric Clapton.

References

External links 
 
 OFSTED page for Meadowhead School

Secondary schools in Sheffield
Academies in Sheffield
Educational institutions established in 1987
1987 establishments in England